Athletics competitions at the 1983 South Pacific Games were held in Apia, Western Samoa, between September 8–15, 1983.

A total of 38 events were contested, 22 by men and 16 by women.

Medal summary
Sources

Men

†:The Fully Automatic Timing failed on September 12, and hand times (ht) were then used.

Women

Medal table (unofficial)

Participation (unofficial)
Athletes from the following 15 countries were reported to participate:

 
 
 
 
 
 
 
 
 Northern Mariana Islands

References

External links
Pacific Games Council
Oceania Athletics Association

Athletics at the Pacific Games
Athletics in Samoa
South Pacific Games
1983 in Samoa
1983 Pacific Games